General Ashfaq Parvez Kayani  (born 20 April 1952), is a retired four-star general of the Pakistan Army who served as the 8th Chief of Army Staff , being appointed on 29 November 2007 after his predecessor Pervez Musharraf retired from his military service and remained in the office until 29 November 2013.

Initially appointed as Vice Chief of Army Staff (VCOAS) under then-President Pervez Musharraf on 8 October 2007, he formally took over the command of the army when President Pervez Musharraf retired from his military service on 29 November 2007. In addition, General Kayani served as the Director-General of the Inter-Services Intelligence (ISI) and as director of the Directorate-General of Military Operations (DGMO), overseeing major war efforts in the war on terror. On 24 July 2010, Kayani's tenure was extended for three more years by Prime Minister Yousaf Raza Gillani to continue the war efforts against the insurgent outfits.

Forbes named him the world's 34th most powerful person in 2011 and the world's 28th most powerful person in 2012.

Early life

Education
Ashfaq Parvez Kayani was born at Manghot, a village located in the Punjab Province, on 20 April 1952. The town of Manghot is situated on the Pothohar Plateau bounded on the east by the Jhelum River, on the west by the Indus River. Ashfaq's father was a Junior commissioned officer (JCO) in the Pakistan Army as Subedar major.

His humble background as the son of a JCO has endeared him to the junior ranks of the army. After attending a local high school, Ashfaq successfully enrolled in the Military College Jhelum, Sarai Alamgir and made a transfer to Pakistan Military Academy in Kakul where he graduated with a bachelor's degree in 1971 in his class of 45th PMA Long Course.

Career

1971 war experience
Kayani was commissioned as 2nd Lieutenant in the 5th Battalion of the famed Baloch Regiment on 29 August 1971. He actively participated and joined the military in the time of 1971 war with Bangladesh.

Academia and professorship
After the war, Ashfaq continued to resume his studies and became more involved with his studies after joining the Command and Staff College in Quetta. After his graduation, Kayani departed to the United States on deputation and educated at the United States Army Command and General Staff College at Fort Leavenworth and the United States Army Infantry School at the Fort Benning. After graduating from the military institutions in the United States, Ashfaq returned to Pakistan and attained his Master of Science in War studies from the National Defence University.

During his long military career, Ashfaq has been on the faculty of School of Infantry and Tactics, also in Quetta. Ashfaq briefly taught war courses at the Command and Staff College in Quetta and later moved on to accepting the professorship of strategic studies and joined the teaching faculty at the National Defence University in Islamabad.

Staff and command appointments
As a Lt Col, Gen Kayani commanded an Infantry Battalion. As a Brigadier, he commanded an Infantry Brigade. As a Brigadier, he also served as Benazir Bhutto's Military Secretary. Upon his promotion to two-star rank, Major-General Kayani served as the general officer commanding of the 12th Infantry Division stationed in Murree, deployed all over the LoC region and which comes under the X Corps. In 2000, Kayani was moved and appointed as the director of the Directorate–General of Military Operations (DGMO). In 2001, it was during his tenure as DGMO that the intense military standoff between Pakistan and India took place. Reportedly, Kayani only slept a few hours a night during that period as he diligently oversaw the unified armed forces mobilisation and preparedness on the border.

In September 2003, Kayani's promotion to three-star assignment was approved by the President Musharraf and subsequently elevating him to three-star rank, Lieutenant-General. The same year, he was appointed as the field operational commander of the X Corps in Rawalpindi. The promotion indicated Musharraf's significant trust in Kayani, since chief of army staff cannot build a military coup without the help of the X Corps commander. Kayani led the X Corps until October 2004, when he was transferred to the ISI as its director-general.

During Kayani's tenure at the X Corps, he led the successful investigation of the two back-to-back suicide attacks against Musharraf in December 2003. It is believed that Kayani won the trust of Musharraf after the investigation, and a prelude to Kayani's appointment as the sensitive position of ISI chief. He was awarded Hilal-e-Imtiaz, the civilian medal, for his achievement.

Intelligence service

Directorship of Inter-Services Intelligence
In October 2004, Lieutenant-General Ashfaq Kayani was appointed as the director general of Directorate of Inter-Services Intelligence (ISI), in place of General Ehsan-ul-Haq, who was promoted as the Chairman of the Joint Chiefs of Staff Committee. General Kayani directed the ISI operations and her operatives during a bleak period, with widely spread insurgencies in North-West Pakistan and Balochistan, disclosing of the nuclear proliferation case, and waves of suicide attacks throughout Pakistan emanating from the northwestern tribal belt. In his final days at the ISI, he also led the talks with Benazir Bhutto for a possible power sharing deal with Musharraf. In October 2007, after three years, he was replaced at the ISI by Lt Gen Nadeem Taj.

Kayani was also present at the March 2007 meeting that took place between Musharraf and Chief Justice Iftikhar Muhammad Chaudhry, when the former military ruler informed the top judge that he was suspended. Accounts of that meeting narrated that Kayani was the only one among Musharraf's aides who did not speak a word.

Chief of Army Staff
In October 2007, Kayani's promotion papers for the appointment to the four-star rank was approved by the President Musharraf, and appointed him as the Vice Chief of Army Staff (VCOAS). At the time of the promotion, Kayani ultimately superseded the senior-most army general, Lt-Gen. Khalid Kidwai, who was on an extension for one year. On 28 November 2007, Kayani succeeded Musharraf as chief of army staff after Musharraf's retirement.

General Kayani is noted as the second four-star army general who held the directorship of the ISI but later then went on to become the Chief of Army Staff. The first appointment of ISI director being appointed to four-star appointment was in 1999 when General Ziauddin Butt was the first army general who was appointed as army chief after his brief tenure as ISI director.

It was during General Kayani's tenure that Pakistan turned the tide in its war against terror. Gen Kayani is also credited with developing response to Indian cold start doctrine, which the Army validated by conducting Azm e Nau exercises.

Withdrawal of military secondment from civilian institutions
In January 2008 General Kayani passed a directive which ordered military officers not to maintain contacts with politicians. It was further made public on 13 February 2008 that General Kayani ordered the withdrawal of military officers from all of Pakistan's government civil departments. It was an action that reversed the policies of his predecessor, President Musharraf. It was welcomed by President Musharraf's critics, who have long demanded that the military distance itself from politics. The Pakistani media reported that the army officers would be withdrawn from 23 wide-ranging civil departments, including the National Highway Authority, National Accountability Bureau, Ministry of Education, and Water and Power Development Authority.

General elections in 2008
On 7 March 2008 General Kayani confirmed that Pakistan's armed forces would stay out of politics and support the new government. He told a gathering of military commanders in the garrison city of Rawalpindi that "the army fully stands behind the democratic process and is committed to playing its constitutional role." The comments made were after the results of the 2008 Pakistani general election where the Pakistan Peoples Party won the election and began forming a coalition government who were opposed to President Pervez Musharraf.

Perceptions of Kayani as COAS
When he became COAS, several top-level US officials visited General Kayani in succession to make up their own minds about him. Most, including the then CIA chief Michael Hayden, National Intelligence Director Mike McConnell and former CENTCOM-commander Admiral William J. Fallon came away confident that Kayani "knows what he's doing."

Kayani's first move as army chief was to visit the front lines in the Federally Administered Tribal Areas (FATA). He launched several successful operations against the TTP and its affiliates. All major kinetic operations, except the operation in North Waizirstan, were conducted under command of Gen Kayani. He used to frequently visit the frontlines and was always easily accessible.

Lt Gen Tariq Khan, Pakistan's famed general, has following words for Gen Kayani: "Gen Kayani did more for the Army than many other Chiefs put together".

War in Afghanistan and the United States

About the Afghan war, Kayani is reported to have said, "the Pakistani people believe that the real aim of U.S. [war] strategy is to denuclearize Pakistan."

In January 2011, and after, there was criticism of General Kayani's handling of the Raymond Davis saga. Davis, a CIA contractor, was hastily tried and acquitted of murder charges in exchange for blood money paid to relatives of the victims, after which he was sent out of Pakistan within a matter of hours. Knowing the dynamics of the Pakistani state and the nature of this particular case, it was impossible for Davis to be released and deported from Pakistan without the knowledge and co-operation of Pakistan's Army and the Inter-Services Intelligence (ISI).

The day after Davis' release, over 40 people were killed in the Datta Khel airstrike in North Waziristan in the FATA, in a drone strike by a US Predator aircraft. The target appeared to be a compound operated by Hafiz Gul Bahadur, a Tehrik-i-Taliban leader. The dead included local tribal leaders. The strike, intended to further the local war effort, instead added to the unpopularity of drone strikes and added to the anti-American sentiment in Pakistan. Kayani conducted a rare press conference in which he condemned the drone strike (even persuading the Pakistani government to summon American Ambassador to Pakistan, Cameron Munter, and lodge a "protest in the strongest possible terms") and labelled it "intolerable". In 2011, after delivering a long lecture at the National Defence University, one staff officer reportedly got up and challenged his policy of co-operation with the United States. The officer asked, "If they don't trust us, how can we trust them?" according to one professor who was briefed on the session. General Kayani essentially responded, "We can't."

Kayani's comments about the Datta Khel strike came to be put in the broader context of public and private communications by Pakistani officials with Washington, including an April 2011, visit by the head of the ISI, Lt. Gen. Ahmed Shuja Pasha, to CIA Director Leon Panetta at CIA headquarters. "[S]ome officials in both countries [were] saying intelligence ties [we]re at their lowest point since the Sept. 11, 2001, attacks spurred the alliance," according to one report. The report went on to say the overall communications included private demands that the CIA suspend drone strikes and also reduce the number of US intelligence and Special Operations personnel in the country. After the ISI-CIA meeting, CIA spokesman George Little said the intelligence relationship "remains on solid footing."

Retirement 

In 2013, General Kayani was in the race for the chairmanship of joint chiefs of staff committee along with Admiral Asif Sandila and Air Chief Marshal Tahir Rafiq; though he was shortlisted for the appointment, on 6 October 2013, General Kayani announced that he would be retiring, his due date of retirement in November, ending speculation that he might get another extension or would be appointed as Chairman Joint Chief of staff Committee.

His retirement was confirmed when Prime Minister Nawaz Sharif approved then-Lieutenant General Raheel Sharif as chief of army staff and Lieutenant General Rashid Mehmood as Chairman Joint chiefs on 27 November 2013. Kayani now resides in Rawalpindi.

Awards and decorations

Foreign decorations

See also

Indo-Pakistani War of 1971
Tariq Majid

References

External links

Official profile at ISPR website
Official profile at Pakistan Army website
Profile at BBC News
Profile at The News

|-

|-

|-

|-
 

Living people
1952 births
Punjabi people
People from Gujar Khan
Pakistan Military Academy alumni
Baloch Regiment officers
People of the Bangladesh Liberation War
Pakistani military personnel of the Indo-Pakistani War of 1971
National Defence University, Pakistan alumni
Academic staff of the National Defence University, Pakistan
Non-U.S. alumni of the Command and General Staff College
Government of Benazir Bhutto staffers and personnel
Pakistani generals
Directors General of Inter-Services Intelligence
Chiefs of Army Staff, Pakistan
People of the insurgency in Khyber Pakhtunkhwa
People of the War in Afghanistan (2001–2021)
Foreign recipients of the Legion of Merit
Psychological warfare theorists
Counterinsurgency theorists
Military theorists